Rachana Narayanankutty is an Indian actress, Kuchipudi dancer, and television presenter who works prominently in Malayalam film and television. She became popular through the television series Marimayam aired in Mazhavil Manorama.

Personal life 

Rachana was born on 1 April 1983 in Thrissur City to Narayanankutty and Narayani. She is the youngest and has a brother. Rachana completed her schooling from G. G. H. S. Wadakanchery in 2005, and she completed her graduation from Sri Vyasa NSS College, Wadakanchery. She was a Communicative English teacher in Devamatha, CBSE School situated in Thrissur district. She took dance classes before she was cast into the television series.

Rachana married Arun Sadasivan in 2011. It was purely an arranged marriage and they had issues. As per Rachana, Arun has started abusing her mentally and physically, which caused her to leave her husband's house after 19 days of marriage.

Film career 

She began her career in 2001 by acting in a small role as the heroine's friend in the film Theerthadanam. After her studies, she joined radio as an RJ, at Radio Mango, Thrissur, where a producer spotted her and cast her in Marimayam. 
She hosted a comedy show Comedy Festival in Mazhavil Manorama. She has also acted in few advertisements and served as judge in the reality show Comedy Express on Asianet. She participated in the reality show Star Challenge on Flowers TV.

She has featured in short films also like ICU, Through Her Eyes, Inverse, Vazhuthana, Moonamidam etc.

Filmography

As an actress

As voice actor

Television

References

External links 
 

1985 births
21st-century Indian actresses
Actresses from Thrissur
Actresses in Malayalam cinema
Actresses in Malayalam television
Indian film actresses
Indian television actresses
Living people